is the record holder as the youngest sailor in the world to circumnavigate the globe in a 176-day continuous single-handed unassisted journey in 1994.

Biography 
He was born in Tokyo and grew up in Kamakura.

He raced his first around the globe race in 2002 during the Around Alone where he finished 4th (Class40), then in the Velux 5 Oceans Race in 2006 where he finished 2nd (IMOCA).

In 2005, he participated in the Velux 5 Oceans Race in his boat, Spirit of Yukoh, and placed second, beating notable sailors such as Sir Robin Knox-Johnston and Mike Golding.

He was the first Asian sailor to take part in the Vendée Globe in 2016, but was force to drop out from the race following a loss of the mast off Cape Town, South Africa. He returned for the 2020-2021 Vendee Globe where he became the first asian sailor to start and complete the race in a time of 94d 21h 32m 56s although he suffered significant sail damage early on the race he persevered and finish the race.

Bibliography
 Kojiro Shiraishi, "Crossing the Seven Seas: The Youngest Yacht in History, Around the World without a Call" (Bungei Shunju, 2000) 
 Ken Noguchi , Kojiro Shiraishi "Great Adventures: Why We Challenge the World" (Bungei Shunju, 2000) 
 "Adventurer: Dream and courage for us... Around the world of a single yacht" (Takarajimasha, 2003) 
 "Around Alone: The World's Toughest Sea Adventure" (Bungei Shunju, 2004) 
 “What I learned in life was learned on the sea: there are walls. Still dream come true" (Yamato Publishing, 2006)

References

External links 
Kojiro Shiraishi Official Website

Living people
1967 births
Japanese sailors
IMOCA 60 class sailors
Single-handed circumnavigating sailors
2016 Vendee Globe sailors
2020 Vendee Globe sailors
Vendée Globe finishers
Japanese Vendee Globe sailors